John II (sometimes John of Séez) was a medieval Bishop of Rochester, England.

Life

John was consecrated around 1139. He died in 1142. He may have been appointed by the pope.

Citations

References
 British History Online Bishops of Rochester accessed on 30 October 2007

Further reading

 
 
 

Bishops of Rochester
12th-century English Roman Catholic bishops
1142 deaths
Anglo-Normans
Year of birth unknown